Hampson Industries plc was a large British provider of engineering services to the aerospace and automotive industries. The company was listed on the London Stock Exchange and is a constituent of the FTSE Fledgling Index. It is now in administration.

History
The company was founded by Thomas "Tommy" Hampson Silk in 1947 in West Bromwich as an electrical engineering concern. It was first listed on the London Stock Exchange in 1966. In 1997 it acquired Arabis Machining Group.

It expanded into the United States in 2004 with the acquisition of Texstars Inc. Further acquisitions in the United States followed in 2005 with Coast Composites Inc. and Lamsco West Inc., in 2007 with Composites Horizon Inc. and in 2008 with Odyssey Industries Inc. and Global Tooling Systems Inc. for £158m. In November, 2012, American Industrial Partners (AIP) acquired the five U.S. operating aerospace subsidiaries of Hampson Industries and formed AIP Aerospace, LLC. Coast Composites, Global Tooling Systems, Odyssey Industries, and Texstars now trade under Ascent Aerospace. Composite Horizons was acquired by Precision Castparts (PCP) in July 2015.

Hampson Industries UK expanded into India in 2005 and set up a factory at Nelamangala, Bangalore. This factory still exists under the name Hampson Industries Pvt Ltd and is owned by noted Indian entrepreneur Mr. Sumanth Reddy.

Operations
The company is organised as follows:
Aerospace components and structures - includes engine casings for the Eurofighter Typhoon
Automotive - includes components for turbochargers for Audi and other makes of car

References

External links
Official site

Companies based in the West Midlands (county)
British companies established in 1947
Engineering companies of the United Kingdom
1947 establishments in England